Mohd. Soffi bin Abd. Razak is a Malaysian politician who has served as Member of the Pahang State Executive Council (EXCO) in the Barisan Nasional (BN) state administration under Menteris Besar Adnan Yaakob and Wan Rosdy Wan Ismail since April 2004 as well as Member of the Pahang State Legislative Assembly (MLA) for Benta since November 1999. He is a member of the United Malays National Organisation (UMNO), a component party of the BN coalition.

Election Results

Honours
 :
 Member of the Order of the Crown of Pahang (AMP)
 Knight Companion of the Order of the Crown of Pahang (DIMP) (2004)
 Knight Companion of the Order of Sultan Ahmad Shah of Pahang (DSAP) – Dato’ (2007)
 Grand Knight of the Order of the Crown of Pahang (SIMP) – Dato’ Indera (2012)
 Grand Knight of the Order of Sultan Ahmad Shah of Pahang (SSAP) – Dato’ Sri (2014)

Notes

References

United Malays National Organisation politicians
Members of the Pahang State Legislative Assembly
Pahang state executive councillors
21st-century Malaysian politicians
Living people
People from Pahang
Malaysian people of Malay descent
Malaysian Muslims
1956 births